Sarah Walsh (born 14 July 1998) is an Australian Paralympic amputee athlete. She represented Australia at the 2016 Rio Paralympics and  2020 Tokyo Paralympics in athletics.

Personal
Walsh was born on 14 July 1998 in Sydney, New South Wales. She was born with fibular hemimelia and this led to her right leg being amputated below the knee when she was 18 months old. She attended St John Bosco College, Sydney.

Athletics
Walsh  was encouraged by a teacher to take up para-athletics at the age of nine. She then joined Helensburgh Little Athletics Club. She received her first prosthetic running blade at the age of 10 as a result of sponsorship from Otto Bock and the Appliance and Limb Centre. She is classified as a T64 athlete. She competed at the 2015 IPC Athletics World Championships in Doha where she finished sixth in the Women's Long Jump T44 and competed in the heats of the Women's 100m T44. In the 2016 Rio Paralympics she competed in the T44 Long jump and receiving a result of 4.82 which placed her 6th overall.

At the 2017 World Para Athletics Championships in London, England, she finished fourth in the Women's Long Jump T44 with a jump of 4.85m.

At the  2019 World Para Athletics Championships in Dubai,  she won the bronze medal in the Women's Long Jump T64 with a leap of 5.20m. 

At the 2020 Tokyo Paralympics, she finished seventh in the  Women's Long Jump T64 with a jump of 5:11m.

She is a member of the Sutherland District Athletics Club and coached by Matt Beckenham.

References

External links
 
 
 Sarah Walsh at Australian Athletics Historical Results
 Sarah Walsh Story at YouTube

Paralympic athletes of Australia
Athletes (track and field) at the 2016 Summer Paralympics
Athletes (track and field) at the 2020 Summer Paralympics
1998 births
Living people
Amputee category Paralympic competitors
Australian amputees
Australian female long jumpers